Hector "Hekkie" Budler (born 18 May 1988) is a South African professional boxer. He is a two-weight world champion, having held the IBO and WBA minimumweight titles between 2011 and 2016 and the unified WBA (Super), IBF, and Ring magazine light-flyweight titles in 2018.

Professional career

IBO light-flyweight champion
Budler was scheduled to fight Juanito Rubillar for the vacant IBO light-flyweight title on February 27, 2010, at the Emperors Palace in Kempton Park. He won the closely contested fight by majority decision. Judges Lulama Mtya and Deon Dwarte scored the fight 117-113 and 115-113 for Budler, while judge Isaac Tshabalala scored the fight as a 114–114 draw.

The close nature of their first meeting prompted IBO to scheduled the rematch between Budler and Rubillar as Budler's first title defense. The bout was scheduled for August 14, 2010 at the Emperors Palace in Kempton Park. Notably, only one South African was named for the three-man panel that would judge the rematch. Budler was once again victorious, as he was awarded the split decision. Two of the judges scored the fight 115-113 and 116-111 for Budler, while the third judge scored the fight 114-113 for Rubillar. Rubbilar was penalized a point in the sixth round for a low blow and was warned about a possible disqualification for low blows in the eight round. From that point onward, Budlar began to take over the fight and won the last three rounds.

Budler was scheduled to face Evaristo Primero in a non-title bout on August 14, 2010, at the Sames Auto Arena in Laredo, Texas. The fight was Budler's first in United States and was the first time that one of his bouts was televised in the United States. Budler failed to impress in the fight, although he won by split decision, with scores of 96–94, 98-92 and 93–97.

Budler was scheduled to make the second defense of his title against the former IBO minimumweight champion Gideon Buthelezi on January 27, 2011, at the Emperors Palace in Kempton Park. Budler lost the fight by split decision. One judge scored the fight 117-113 for Budler, while the remaining two judges scored it 118-114 and 115-113 for Buthelezi.

IBO minimumweight champion
After losing his IBO light flyweight title, Budler moved down in weight to minimumweight. For his first fight in a new weight class, Budler was scheduled to face the journeyman Luyanda Nkwankwa on May 29, 2011. He won the fight by a fourth-round knockout.

Budler was scheduled to fight Michael Landero for the vacant IBO minimumweight title on September 24, 2011. He won the fight by a unanimous decision.

Budler was scheduled to face Shamila Kortman in a non-title bout on March 26, 2012. He won the eight round bout by unanimous decision, with two judges awarding him almost every round of the fight (79-74 and 78–74), while the third judge scored it as a surprising 79–78. Bulder once again failed to impress against over-matched opposition, with one outlet stating that "neither fighter showed any decent boxing skills".

Budler was scheduled to make his first title defense against the former IBF Minimumweight World Champion Florante Condes on September 22, 2012. He won the fight by unanimous decision, with scores of 116–112, 118-110 and 115–113. Budler spent the majority of the fight on the backfoot, scoring points with straight pushes, while Condes was unable to successfully pressure the champion.

Budler was scheduled to face Renan Trongco in his second IBO minimumweight title defense on February 16, 2013. Trongco stepped in as a short notice replacement Merlito Sabillo, who withdrew from the bout with a hand injury. Budler won the fight by a wide unanimous decision, with two judges scoring the fight 117–111, while the third judge scored it 118–110.

Budler was scheduled to fight the former IBF and IBO mini flyweight champion Nkosinathi Joyi on June 15, 2013. He won the fight by split decision, outscoring his fellow South African on two of the judges scorecards. Judge Tony Nyangiwe awarded him a 115-113 scorecard, judge Reg Thomson awarded him a 116-113 scorecard, while the judge Arthur Ellensohn scored the fight 116-112 for Joyi.

IBO and WBA minimumweight champion
Budler was scheduled to face Hugo Hernan Verchelli on November 9, 2013. The fight was simultaneously a fight for the vacant WBA interim minimumweight title, as well as an IBO minimumweight title defense. Budler won the fight by a fourth-round stoppage. He knocked Verchelli down three times before the 2:30 minute mark: the first time with a left hook, the second and third time with a body shot.

Budler was scheduled to fight Karluis Diaz for the IBO minimumweight and vacant WBA minimumweight title on March 1, 2014. Budler notched the quickest victory of his career, flooring Diaz with an overhand right at the 2:59 minute mark.

Budler was scheduled to make his first title defense as a double-champion against Vicha Phulaikaw on June 21, 2014. Budler scored his third consecutive stoppage victory, stopping Vicha in the eight round. The knockout was preceded by two knockdowns, one each in the first and eight rounds.

Budler was scheduled to made his second title defense as a double-champion against the Xiong Chaozhong on October 25, 2014. He won the fight by unanimous decision, with scores of 114–112, 114-112 and 118–108. Each fighter scored a knockdown in the second round.

Budler was scheduled to defend his world titles against the Mexican Jesús Silvestre on February 21, 2015. The fight was set for the Gennady Golovkin and Martin Murray undercard. Budler won the fight by unanimous decision, with two judges awarding him a 115-112 scorecard, while the third judge awarded him a wider 117-110 scorecard.

Budler was scheduled to defend his two world titles for the third time against Simphiwe Khonco on September 19, 2015. He won the fight by unanimous decision, with scores of 117–111, 115-113 and 116–112.

Budler was scheduled to defend his titles against Byron Rojas on March 19, 2016. The fact that the bout was contested in South Africa, as well as the fact that Rojas hadn't faced the same level of opposition as Budler, resulted in Rojas coming into the fight as an underdog. Rojas won the fight by unanimous decision, with all three judges scoring the fight 115–113 in his favor.

IBO light-flyweight champion
After suffering his first loss in nearly six years, Budler was scheduled to face Siyabonga Siyo for the vacant WBA Pan-African light-flyweight title on October 22, 2016. It was his first fight at light flyweight since his loss to Gideon Buthelezi on January 27, 2011. Budler beat Siyo by unanimous decision, with scores of 116–112, 116-112 and 118–110. He remained in control for the duration of the bout, successfully countering anytime Siyo tried to get on the inside.

Budler was scheduled to fight Joey Canoy for the vacant IBO light-flyweight title on February 4, 2017. Budler notched his first stoppage victory in two years, after Canoy retired from the fight at the end of the seventh round.

Budler was scheduled to challenge the reigning IBF light flyweight champion Milan Melindo on September 16, 2017. It was one of his rare fights outside of South Africa, as it was contested at the Waterfront Hotel & Casino in Cebu City, Philippines. Melindo won the closely contested, high paced bout by split decision. Two judges awarded Melindo a 117-110 and 115-112 scorecard, while the third judge scored it 115-113 for Budler.

WBA, IBF and The Ring light flyweight champion
Budler was scheduled to challenge the unified WBA (Super), IBF, and The Ring light-flyweight titlist Ryoichi Taguchi on May 20, 2018. Despite coming into the fight as an underdog, Budler won the fight by unanimous decision, with all three judges scoring the bout 114–113 in his favor. Taguchi failed to make use of his height and reach advantage, as Budler successfully outboxed him utilizing outfighting tactics. Budler became the first South African to win three world titles simultaneously, the first African to win the Ring Magazine belt, and the first South African under the new Boxing SA (BSA) Act of 2001 to win the Ring Magazine title.

In June 2021, IBF ordered Budler to make a mandatory defense against Felix Alvarado. As the two sides were unable to come to an agreement, the fight went to a purse bid. Sampson Boxing won with a bid of $25 000. with a split of 75% to Budler and 25% to Alvarado. Budler subsequently vacated the title, stating: "The purse money I was offered to defend was not good".

Budler was scheduled to make his first title defense as a unified title holder against Hiroto Kyoguchi on December 31, 2018, at the Wynn Palace in Macau. The fight was on the undercard of the Donnie Nietes and Kazuto Ioka main event. Despite his status as the reigning champion, Budler came into the fight as an underdog. Kyoguchi won the fight by a tenth-round technical knockout. Budler claimed he had trouble properly breathing in the fight, as he was having sinus issues going into the fight.

Post title reign
Budler was scheduled to face Jonathan Almacen for the vacant WBC Silver light-flyweight title on May 22, 2021. It was Budler's first fight since losing to Kyoguchi on December 31, 2018, almost three years prior. He won the fight by a wide unanimous decision, with scores of 118–111, 118-111 and 117–111.

Budler was scheduled to face Elwin Soto in the main event of a TV Azteca broadcast card on June 25, 2022, at the Palenque del FEX in Mexicali, Mexico in a WBC light flyweight title eliminator. Bulder won the fight by unanimous decision, with all three judges scoring the bout 114–113 in his favor. He landed the sole knockdown of the fight in the twelfth round, which proved to be the decisive moment of the fight, as he would have lost the fight otherwise.

On November 9, 2022, the reigning WBC, The Ring and WBA (Super) champion Kenshiro Teraji was ordered to make a mandatory title defense against Budler.

Professional boxing record

See also 
List of WBA world champions
List of strawweight boxing champions

References

External links

1988 births
Living people
Light-flyweight boxers
International Boxing Organization champions
World boxing champions
World Boxing Association champions
Mini-flyweight boxers
World mini-flyweight boxing champions
Boxers from Johannesburg
South African male boxers
The Ring (magazine) champions
International Boxing Federation champions